Toby Johnson (born 1945 in San Antonio, Texas) is an American novelist and writer in the field of gay spirituality.

Life 
After leaving seminary in 1970, Johnson moved to San Francisco and lived in the Bay Area throughout the 1970s. While a student at the California Institute of Asian Studies (later renamed the California Institute of Integral Studies), from which he received a graduate degree in Comparative Religion and a doctorate in Counseling Psychology, Johnson was on staff at the Mann Ranch Seminars, a Jungian-oriented summer retreat program. There he befriended religion scholar Joseph Campbell.

Johnson authored three novels: Plague: A Novel About Healing, Secret Matter, and Getting Life in Perspective.  Plague, produced by small gay-interest publisher Alyson Publications, was one of the first novels to treat AIDS through fiction.  Secret Matter, a speculative, romantic comedy about truth-telling and gay identity featuring a retelling of the Genesis myth with a gay-positive outcome, won a Lambda Literary Award in 1990 and in 1999 was a nominee to the Gay Lesbian Science-Fiction Hall of Fame, the first year of the award. He collaborated with historian, anthropologist Walter L. Williams on the novel Two Spirits: A Story of Life With the Navajo. And co-edited, with Steve Berman, publisher of Lethe Press, an anthology of gay-positive stories, Charmed Lives: Gay Spirit in Storytelling.

He is also author of Gay Spirituality: The Role of Gay Identity in the Transformation of Human Consciousness  and Gay Perspective: Things Our Homosexuality Tells Us about the Nature of God and the Universe, which explains how homosexuality can lead to a re-evaluation of people's role in the universe.

From 1996 to 2003, Johnson was editor/publisher of White Crane Journal, a periodical focusing on gay men's spirituality.  As of 2012, he worked as a literary editor with Lethe Press.

His papers are held at the Happy Foundation, San Antonio, Texas.

Bibliography

Gay Perspective: Things Our Homosexuality Tells Us about the Nature of God and the Universe Peregrine Ventures, 2003, 
Gay Spirituality: The Role of Gay Identity in the Transformation of Human Consciousness Peregrine Ventures, 2000, 2010, 
Secret Matter. Peregrine Ventures, 2005,  . This is a science fiction novel, set in San Francisco.
Getting Life in Perspective Peregrine Ventures 1991, 2010, 
Plague: A Novel about Healing Alyson Books, 1987, 9781555831257, Republished as "The Fourth Quill" by Peregrine Ventures, 2014 
Two Spirits: A Story of Life With the Navajo (With Walter L. Williams, PhD) Peregrine Ventures, 2006, 
The Myth of the Great Secret: A Search for Spiritual Meaning in the Face of Emptiness William Morrow and Company, 1981, 
The Myth of the Great Secret (2nd Edition): An Appreciation of Joseph Campbell Celestial Arts, 1991, 
In Search of God in the Sexual Underworld William Morrow and Company, 1983, 9780688020460
Finding Your Own True Myth: What I Learned from Joseph Campbell: The Myth of the Great Secret III Peregrine Ventures, 2018, 
Finding God in the Sexual Underworld: The Journey Expanded Peregrine Ventures, 2020,

As editor

Charmed Lives: Gay Spirit in Storytelling (co-edited with Steve Berman) (2006). The inaugural title in the White Crane Wisdom Series, this anthology of inspirational essays and short fiction for gay men earned Johnson a Lambda Literary Award nomination.

See also
 LGBT rights in Texas

References

External links 
 Official Website Toby Johnson

21st-century American novelists
American gay writers
1945 births
Living people
Lambda Literary Award winners
American spiritual writers
American LGBT novelists
LGBT people from Texas
American male novelists
21st-century American male writers
21st-century American non-fiction writers
American male non-fiction writers